The Victorian Tertiary Admissions Centre (VTAC) is the administrative body which processes applications for universities (and other tertiary institutions) in the state of Victoria (Australia).

Application system
Victorian Tertiary Admissions Centre (VTAC) processes applications from suitably qualified students, which may list up to 12 preferences for tertiary courses in the state of Victoria. Tertiary institutions determine whether the applicant is given an offer to undertake a course – VTAC then informs students of the highest preferred course they have been offered, if any.

See also
 Australian Tertiary Admission Rank

References

External links
 VTAC website

Education in Victoria (Australia)
Australian tertiary education admission agencies